Candlesby with Gunby is a civil parish in the East Lindsey district of Lincolnshire, England, about  east of the town of Spilsby, and includes the village of Candlesby and hamlet of Gunby, the population of which in 2001 was 178, reducing to 129 at the 2011 Census.

References

East Lindsey District
Civil parishes in Lincolnshire